Interceltic Festival may refer to:
Festival Interceltique de Lorient, Brittany, France
Interceltic Festival of Avilés, Asturias, Spain
Interceltic Festival of Morrazo, Moaña, Galicia, Spain

See also
Ortigueira's Festival of Celtic World, Galicia, Spain